Marchant is a surname. Notable people with the surname include:

 Adio Marchant (born 1987), English singer and songwriter known professionally as Bipolar Sunshine
 Alison Marchant, Australian politician
 Chesten Marchant (died 1676), last monoglot Cornish speaker
 David R. Marchant, glacial geologist 
 Edward Dalton Marchant (1806–1887), American artist
 George Marchant (1857–1941), Australian soft-drink manufacturer and philanthropist
 Henry Marchant (1741–1796), American lawyer and delegate to the Continental Congress (1777 to 1779)
 Sir Herbert Stanley Marchant, 20th Century British diplomat and writer
 Jeremy Marchant Forde (born 1966), English biologist
 John Le Marchant (British Army officer, born 1766) (1766–1812), English major-general
 Sir John Le Marchant (British Army officer, born 1803) (1803–1874), English general and Governor of Newfoundland
 Julio Marchant (born 1980), Argentine football (soccer) player
 Katy Marchant (born 1993), British track cyclist 
 Kenny Marchant (born 1951), Republican member of US House of Representatives
 Maria Elise Allman Marchant (1869–1919), New Zealand school principal
 Stephen Marchant (1912–2003), Australian geologist and amateur ornithologist
 Stephen Marchant (actor), Irish actor
 Todd Marchant (born 1973), American ice hockey player
 Tony Marchant (playwright) (born 1959), British playwright and television dramatist
 Willim "Frenchie" Marchant, Northern Irish loyalist and Ulster Volunteer Force member

See also
 Joker Marchant Stadium, baseball field located in Lakeland, Florida
 Marchant Calculator, American company, founded in 1911 by Rodney and Alfred Marchant
 Marchand
 Merchant (surname)

French-language surnames
Occupational surnames